Dobbyn is a surname, and it reached number 72 in the Top 100 Surnames of the world.

Notable people with the surname include:

Dave Dobbyn (born 1957)
John F. Dobbyn, American mystery writer and law professor